Bosko is an animated cartoon character created by animators Hugh Harman and Rudolf Ising. Bosko was the first recurring character in Leon Schlesinger's cartoon series and was the star of 39 Looney Tunes shorts released by Warner Bros. He was voiced by Carman Maxwell, Johnny Murray, and Billie "Buckwheat" Thomas during the 1920s and 1930s and once by Don Messick during the 1990s.

Creation and the first film 
In 1927, Harman and Ising worked for the Walt Disney Studios on a series of live-action/animated short subjects known as the Alice Comedies. The two animators created Bosko in 1928 to capitalize on the new "talkie" craze that was sweeping the motion picture industry. They began thinking about making a sound cartoon with Bosko in 1928 before even leaving Walt Disney. Hugh Harman made drawings of the new character and registered it with the copyright office on January 3, 1928. The character was registered as a "Negro boy" under the name of Bosko.

After leaving Walt Disney in early 1928, Harman and Ising went to work for Charles Mintz on Universal's second-season Oswald the Lucky Rabbit cartoons. April 1929 found them moving on again, leaving Universal to market their new cartoon character. In May 1929, they produced a short pilot cartoon, similar to Max Fleischer's Out of the Inkwell cartoons, Bosko, the Talk-Ink Kid that showcased their ability to animate soundtrack-synchronized speech and dancing. The short, plotless cartoon opens with live action footage of Ising at a drafting table. After he draws Bosko on the page, the character springs to life, talks, sings, dances, and plays the piano. Ising returns Bosko to the inkwell, and the short ends. This short is a landmark in animation history as being the first cartoon to predominantly feature synchronized speech, though Fleischer Studios' Song Car-Tune "My Old Kentucky Home" was the first cartoon to contain animated dialogue a few years earlier. This cartoon set Harman and Ising "apart from early Disney sound cartoons because it emphasized not music but dialogue." The short was marketed to various people by Harman and Ising until Leon Schlesinger offered them a contract to produce a series of cartoons for Warner Bros. It would not be seen by a wide audience until 70 years later, in 2000, as part of Cartoon Network's special Toonheads: The Lost Cartoons, a compilation special of rare material from the WB/Turner archives.

In his book, Of Mice and Magic, Leonard Maltin states that this early version of Bosko

Bosko and Looney Tunes 

Schlesinger saw the Harman-Ising test film and signed the animators to produce cartoons at their studio for him to sell to Warner Bros. Bosko became the star vehicle for the studio's new Looney Tunes cartoon series. Bosko wore long pants and a derby hat, and he had a girlfriend named Honey and a dog named Bruno. He was also sometimes accompanied by Honey's cat-like son named Wilbur and an often antagonistic goat, particularly in early cartoons.

The role of Bosko was to serve as a cartoony version of Al Jolson in The Jazz Singer (1927). According to Ising, he was initially supposed to be an "inkspot sort of thing". He was not conceived as either a human or an animal, though behaving like a little boy. According to Leonard Maltin, Bosko was a cartoonized version of a young black boy who spoke a Southern dialect of African American Vernacular English. He cites as an example a phrase from Bosko's Holiday, said with an intermittent drawl: "I sho'done likes picnics."

Whether admiring a dress worn by Honey or eating a sandwich (with exaggerated chewing) Bosko had a stock exclamatory reaction indicating his pleasure "Mmmm! Dat sho' is fine!" which became something of a catch phrase

According to Terry Lindvall and Ben Fraser, Bosko and Honey "were the most balanced portrayals of blacks in cartoons to that point". They had the same type of formulaic coy adventures as Mickey and Minnie Mouse. They point to Bosko in Person (1933) where Honey gives a Billie Holiday-style performance as an example of nonracist racial tribute to a real person. According to Tom Bertino, Harman and Ising never called attention to Bosko's racial status, and stayed clear of negative stereotypes involving dice and watermelon. Bosko instead received positive portrayals as a spunky and resourceful boy. An exception to this was a demeaning representation in Congo Jazz (1930). Bosko in a jungle setting is depicted standing between a small monkey and a gorilla. All three are depicted with virtually identical faces. The only things identifying him as human is his relative size and his clothes.

From his first Looney Tunes outing, Sinkin' in the Bathtub, Bosko would star in 39 musical films (one of which was not released). His cartoons are notable for their generally weak plots and their abundance of music, singing, and dancing (though there were exceptions, such as Bosko the Doughboy, in 1931). These were the early days of sound cartoons, and audiences were enthralled simply to see characters talking and moving in step with the music. In terms of animation, the shorts are on-par with Disney's shorts of the same period. Harman and Ising were allowed production costs of up to $6000 per cartoon. During the same period, Disney was spending around $10,000 per cartoon. The smaller budgets forced Harman and Ising to recycle footage much more often than Disney did.

In terms of music and sound recording, however, Harman and Ising had an advantage, as the Warner Bros. provided access to a large musical library with all the popular tunes of the day, lavish orchestras (like Abe Lyman's) and sound recording equipment and staff free of charge. Disney, on the other hand, had no access to a music library and was forced to rely, for the most part, on public domain music.

Vaudeville was the major entertainment of the time, and the cartoons of the era are better understood when compared to it rather than to animation of later decades. Though rudimentary by today's standards, Bosko's films were quite popular in their day and he rivaled Mickey Mouse in popularity in the early 1930s, although the Disney cartoons would eventually surge ahead in popularity on the basis of stronger plot and character development.

In the later Looney Tunes shorts which Bosko appeared, his accent was gone. Consequently, his race became more ambiguous.

Bosko at MGM 
In 1933, Harman and Ising broke with Warner Bros. over budget disputes with Schlesinger. Having learned from Walt Disney's experiences with Oswald the Lucky Rabbit, they had carefully kept all rights to the Bosko character, and they took him with them. The two found work with Metro-Goldwyn-Mayer where they launched the Happy Harmonies cartoon series. At first, Bosko appeared in his original design and some of the old animation from the Looney Tunes series was even reused in those Happy Harmonies that features Bosko. However, after only two cartoons, the character was redesigned into an identifiable black boy, similar in appearance to Inki and Lil' Eightball, with an overactive imagination. This redesigned Bosko, whom many consider to be a different character altogether, in spite of having the same name, only starred in seven negatively-received cartoons before Harman and Ising discontinued the character. The career of the character ended for good when MGM fired Harman and Ising due to cost overruns in the films they produced. They were replaced by Fred Quimby, who later hired Harman and Ising back, though Bosko did not make any appearances in subsequent MGM subjects produced by them.

Bosko on television 
Bosko cartoons were packaged with other Looney Tunes and Merrie Melodies, to be broadcast in various television markets in the 1950s. For instance, "Skipper Frank" (Frank Herman), showed Bosko, along with Buddy, on "Cartoon Carousel" his hour-long afterschool cartoon program on KTLA-TV (Channel 5) in Los Angeles. Bosko cartoons were also later aired on Nickelodeon as part of the network's Looney Tunes program beginning in 1988 and ending in 1992, when the network pulled all black and white shorts out of rotation to make room for more recent color cartoons featuring more popular Warner characters.

Bosko appeared in a 1990 episode of the television series Tiny Toon Adventures titled "Fields of Honey". In a parody of the then-current film Field of Dreams, a mysterious voice leads Babs Bunny to build a theater that shows nothing but cartoons of Bosko's girlfriend Honey, after being told about Honey (voiced by B. J. Ward) by the Acme Looniversity's mysterious vaultkeeper (voiced by Don Messick). Babs does so, and the resulting audience laughter rejuvenates the aged and ailing Honey. The laughter also rejuvenates the vaultkeeper, who is revealed to be none other than Bosko himself as well as the source of the voice. The cartoon depicts Bosko and Honey as dog-like talking animals similar to the lead characters of the later television series, Animaniacs, presumably so as not to offend viewers with the original black-face characterizations.

The character is also seen in a portrait in the 1996 film Space Jam, this time in his original form. He also appears in his original form in the Animaniacs cartoon "The Girl with the Googily Goop", in which he is seen parking his car. He was also seen in a Futurama opening in Sinkin' in the Bathtub at the part where he runs off a cliff from the car with Honey in it.

The majority of the cartoons are available on VHS and DVD in the Uncensored Bosko series from Bosko Video. In 2003, Warner Home Video officially released the initial pilot film Bosko, the Talk-Ink Kid, as an extra on the Looney Tunes Golden Collection Volume 1 DVD box set. Looney Tunes Golden Collection: Volume 3 (released in 2005) also includes the first Looney Tunes short, Sinkin' in the Bathtub (which originally introduced Bosko and Honey to audiences in 1930) as an extra. Looney Tunes Golden Collection: Volume 6 (released in 2008) includes several Bosko films on a disc officially devoted to Bosko and other early 1930s characters.

All the Bosko cartoons subject to copyright remain owned by Warner Bros., but the majority of Bosko cartoons have fallen into the public domain. WB also owns the MGM cartoons through subsidiary Turner Entertainment Co. when Ted Turner bought the library in 1986.

Filmography

References

Sources

Further reading 
 Barrier, Michael (1999): Hollywood Cartoons. Oxford University Press.
 Maltin, Leonard (1987): Of Mice and Magic: A History of American Animated Cartoons. Penguin Books.
 Schneider, Steve (1999): That's All Folks!: The Art of Warner Bros. Animation. Barnes and Noble Books.
 Beck, Jerry and Friedwald, Will (1989): Looney Tunes and Merrie Melodies: A Complete Illustrated Guide to the Warner Bros. Cartoons. Henry Holt and Company.

External links 

 Bosko at Toonzone.net
 Bosko at Don Markstein's Toonopedia. Archived from the original on February 22, 2018.

Looney Tunes characters
Fictional musicians
Fictional African-American people
Male characters in animation
Film characters introduced in 1929
Warner Bros. cartoon characters
 
Animated characters introduced in 1929